Nantucket is a Southern rock band formed in Jacksonville, North Carolina in 1969. Originally known as a Beach music band named Stax of Gold, and later Nantucket Sleighride (after the song and album by Mountain), the six-member group—Tommy Redd, Larry Uzzell, Mike Uzzell, Eddie Blair, Kenny Soule, and Mark Downing—first became successful in their home state of North Carolina as a cover band.

Background
The band signed with Epic Records in 1977 and released its self-titled album the following year, which featured the single "Heartbreaker." A cross-country tour followed, with Nantucket opening for KISS, Styx, Boston, Mother's Finest, Journey, and The Doobie Brothers. It sold around 200,000 copies and also made the Billboard charts. In 1979, Nantucket followed up with Your Face or Mine?.

Mike Uzzell was dismissed from the band by the third album, with Pee Wee Watson replacing him on bass guitar. As a tribute to AC/DC lead singer Bon Scott, who died in 1980, Nantucket's Long Way to the Top included a version of the 1975 classic "It’s a Long Way to the Top (If You Wanna Rock 'N' Roll)". The move landed the band a spot with AC/DC on its Back in Black tour for the entire summer.

Even though Nantucket found some success, Epic Records eventually dropped the band. Drummer Kenny Soule and bassist Pee Wee Watson left in 1981, joining guitarist Michael Gardner to form rock trio PKM. They were replaced by Richard Gates and David "Thumbs" Johnson for Nantucket's fourth album. Following the band's last two studio albums, which were produced in 1983 and 1985, the group disbanded in 1990.

The original members of Nantucket reunited in 1991 to record a live session and released an album called Still Live after All These Years in 1995. It featured earlier songs and new material. The band occasionally played night clubs throughout the Carolinas while continuing its side projects. A recent show featured both Nantucket and PKM, and a new release called The Unreleased "D.C. Tapes" was released with eight new Nantucket songs.

The first three studio albums were released on compact disc by re-issue label Wounded Bird Records in 2003 and 2004. Nantucket V was made available on CD through re-issue label Retrospect Records in 2007. No Direction Home was made available on CD through re-issue label American Beat Records in 2009.

Nantucket released the CD "You Need A Ride To Raleigh" and was inducted into the North Carolina Music Hall of Fame on October 11, 2012.

Mike Uzzell played his last show April 2015 after again being dismissed from the band, and for an interim period was replaced with Durwood Martin; history repeated itself when Pee Wee Watson returned as the full-time bass player, joining the band in February 2016.

Band members
Tommy Redd: Lead & Rhythm Guitars, Acoustic Guitar, Spoon, Lead & Background Vocals
Larry Uzzell: Lead & Background Vocals, Bass Guitar, Trumpet, Harp, Congas, Percussion, Harmonica
Eddie Blair: Tenor & Soprano Saxophones, Keyboards, Piano, Organ, Clavinet, Percussion, Background Vocals
Jason Patterson: Drums & Percussion, Background Vocals
Walter Garland:Lead Guitar
Pee Wee Watson: Bass Guitar, Vocals

Past
Ronnie Waters: Lead Guitar, Vocals
Kenny Soule: Drums & Percussion, Tympani, Background Vocals
Mark Downing: Lead, Slide, Rhythm & Acoustic Guitars, 12-String Guitar, Pedal Guitar
Richard Gates: Drums, Oberheim DX Drum Machine
David "Thumbs" Johnson: Bass Guitar, Oberheim DX Drum Machine, Background Vocals
Alan Thornton: Lead & Rhytham Guitars, Z-28
Perry Richardson: Bass Guitar and Background Vocals
Rob "Kid Blister" Green: Lead Guitar and Background Vocals (1986–88)
Chris Cash: Lead Guitar and Background Vocals (1988–1990)
Benny Dellinger: Lead Guitar and Background Vocals (1994-2011)
Mike Uzzell: Moog Bass, Synthesizer, B-3 Organ, Lead & Background Vocals (- April 2015)
Durwood Martin: keyboard bass, vocals (interim)

Discography

Albums
Nantucket (1978)
Your Face or Mine? (1979)
Long Way to the Top (#206) (1980)
No Direction Home (1983)
Nantucket V (1984)
The Best of Nantucket (1986)
Still Live after All These Years (1995)
The Unreleased "D.C. Tapes" (2005)
You Need a Ride to Raleigh (2011)

Singles
"Heartbreaker" (1977)
"She's No Good" (1977)
"Quite Like You" (1978)
"Girl, You Blew a Good Thing" (1978)
"Gimme Your Love" (1979)
"Hiding from Love" (1983)

References

 Nantucket - A Band Of Desperate Men. Nantucket: Credits. Retrieved Apr. 20, 2007.
 Nantucket - A Band Of Desperate Men (PKM). Nantucket: Credits. Retrieved Apr. 20, 2007.
 Allmusic. [ Nantucket: Credits]. Retrieved Apr. 20, 2007.
 The Daily Reflector. Nantucket: Credits. Retrieved Apr. 20, 2007.
 MusicMight. Nantucket: Credits. Retrieved Apr. 21, 2007.

External links
 Nantucket (Official Website)
 [ Nantucket on Allmusic]

Epic Records artists
Musical groups established in 1969
Rock music groups from North Carolina
American southern rock musical groups